Mount Bago is an  mountain summit located west of the crest of the Sierra Nevada mountain range, in the southeast corner of Fresno County, in northern California. The John Muir Trail passes to the northeast of this remote geographical feature. The first ascent of the summit was made July 11, 1896, by Joseph Nisbet LeConte and Wilson S. Gould.

Climate
According to the Köppen climate classification system, Mount Bago is located in an alpine climate zone. Most weather fronts originate in the Pacific Ocean, and travel east toward the Sierra Nevada mountains. As fronts approach, they are forced upward by the peaks, causing them to drop their moisture in the form of rain or snowfall onto the range (orographic lift). Precipitation runoff from the peak drains into tributaries of Bubbs Creek, which in turn is a tributary of the South Fork Kings River.

See also
 
 List of mountain peaks of California

References

External links
 Weather forecast: Mount Bago

Mountains of Fresno County, California
Mountains of Kings Canyon National Park
North American 3000 m summits
Mountains of Northern California
Sierra Nevada (United States)